The 2013 Puskás Cup was the sixth edition of the Puskás Cup and took place 29 March to 1 April. Budapest Honvéd were the defending champions. Real Madrid won their second title by defeating Panathinaikos 2–0 in the final.

Participating teams
 Budapest Honvéd (former club of Ferenc Puskás)
 Hagi Football Academy (invited)
 Melbourne Football Institute (invited)
 Panathinaikos (former club of Ferenc Puskás)
 Puskás Akadémia (host)
 Real Madrid (former club of Ferenc Puskás)

Venues
Stadion Sóstói
Felcsút

Results
All times are local (UTC+2).

Group A

Group B

Fifth place play-off

External links
Official website

2010
2012–13 in Spanish football
2012–13 in Hungarian football
2012–13 in Greek football
2012–13 in Romanian football
2013 in Australian soccer